Grady Newsource is a news source based out of University of Georgia's Grady College journalism school.

References

Student newspapers published in Georgia (U.S. state)